Filago is a genus of plants in the sunflower family, native from Europe and northern Africa to Mongolia, Nepal, and Macaronesia. They are sometimes called cottonroses or cudweeds.

The name cudweed comes from the fact that they were once used to feed cows that had lost the ability to chew the cud.

Several species are sometimes treated as members of the genus Logfia.

Description
They bear woolly, cottony heads of flowers. They have narrow strap-shaped untoothed leaves.  The flower heads are small, gathered into dense, stalkless clusters.  The fruits have a hairy pappus, or modified calyx, the part of an individual disk, ray or ligule floret surrounding the base of the corolla, in flower heads of the plant family Asteraceae.

Species
The following species are recognised in the genus Filago:

References

External links
 
 Jepson Manual Treatment

Gnaphalieae
Asteraceae genera